Stockley is a hamlet on the eastern outskirts of Okehampton, in Devon, England.

It lies just north of the A30.

References

Hamlets in Devon